Gurov and Anna is a Canadian drama film, directed by Rafaël Ouellet and released in 2014. The film stars Andreas Apergis as Ben, a literature professor in Montreal who is obsessed with Anton Chekhov's short story "The Lady with the Dog", and begins trying to act it out in his real life by commencing a love affair with his student Mercedes (Sophie Desmarais) in which he can be the Gurov to her Anna.

The film went into production in March 2014. It was both Ouellet's first English-language film, and his first time directing a screenplay he had not written himself.

The film premiered in October 2014 at the 19th Busan International Film Festival, and had its Canadian premiere later in the month at the Festival du nouveau cinéma, before going into commercial release in early 2015.

Screenwriter Céleste Parr received a nomination for Best Screenplay at the 18th Quebec Cinema Awards in 2016.

References

External links

Gurov and Anna at Library and Archives Canada

2014 films
Canadian romantic drama films
English-language Canadian films
Films shot in Montreal
Films set in Montreal
Films directed by Rafaël Ouellet
2010s English-language films
2010s Canadian films